Oak Park High School is a public high school located in Oak Park, Michigan an inner suburb of Detroit. The school is part of the Oak Park School district. It serves about 1,130 students in grades 9 to 12 from Oak Park and surrounding communities around Detroit.

In 2010, as a part of the Federal School Improvement Framework, the school was identified by the State of Michigan as one of 92 schools with the lowest achieving, according to performance on Michigan standardized tests. Eligible schools were invited to apply for a grant of up to 6 million dollars over three years to support efforts to raise academic achievement.

Oak Park High School's grant application was awarded $4.2 million. The school was one of 28 schools that were awarded grant funds.

The school colors are red, black, and white. The school mascot is the Oak Park Knights.

Oak Park High School Athletic Hall of Fame
 Oak Park High School (coached by Alvin Delidow) won the Class-A team championship trophy at the 1972 Michigan High School Athletic Association Boys' Track and Field Finals. At those same finals, the 440-yard relay team of Tony Craighead, Henry Staton, Adolph Mongo, and Mike Rollins brought home gold for Oak Park.
 At the 2010 MHSAA Girls' Track and Field Finals, Dissa Swint-Cook won the 200-meter dash; becoming Oak Park High School's first individual state champion in nearly thirty years.
 At the 1982 MHSAA Girls' Track and Field, Bernard Wells became the first coach to win a team championship. Team captains Michele (Mimi) Morris and VeronCia VC Daffin lead the way to this victory.
 In 1984, Oak Park won the MHSAA Class-B boys' basketball championship with a 62–54 victory over Saginaw-Buena Vista High School.

Notable alumni

Jamie Arnold – retired American-Israeli professional basketball player
Edwin Baker – NFL running back
Bass Brothers (Eminem)
Vincent Chin – industrial draftsman and murder victim
Marcella Detroit – vocalist, guitarist, and songwriter  – Shakespears Sister
Larry Downes - author
Doug Fieger – singer-songwriter-musician  – The Knack
Les Gold – founder of American Jewelry and Loan; star of Hardcore Pawn
John Kelly – American football running back
Andrew Lippa – composer
Paul Milgrom – Nobel Prize-winning economist
Jeffrey David Sachs – economist and Director of the Earth Institute at Columbia University.
Bruce Seid - Major League Baseball scout and executive
Jeffrey Seller – producer, Rent
Ron Suresha – author and editor
Don Was – musician, bassist, and record producer  – Was (Not Was)

References

External links
Oak Park High School website

Educational institutions established in 1953
Public high schools in Michigan
High schools in Oakland County, Michigan
1953 establishments in Michigan